The Mitsubishi Triton or Mitsubishi L200 is a compact pickup truck produced by Mitsubishi Motors. In Japan, where it has only been sold intermittently and in small numbers, it was originally known as the Mitsubishi Forte and from 1991 as the Strada. In the United States, Chrysler Corporation sold captive imports as the Dodge D50, Dodge Ram 50 and Plymouth Arrow truck, and Mitsubishi marketed it as the Mitsubishi Mighty Max until 2002.

For most export markets the name L200 is used, though it has also been known as the Rodeo, Colt, Storm, Magnum, Strakar (used in Portugal since 1999; Strakar is a portmanteau of Strada and Dakar), and others. In 2015, Fiat Professional launched a rebadged version as the Fiat Fullback. In 2016, Ram Trucks launched a rebadged version as the Ram 1200 for the Middle East market.

Cumulative sales of the first three generations exceeded 2.8 million units around the world.  the pickup truck is sold in every available Mitsubishi market except the United States, Canada, Japan, India and China. In Japan, it was previously sold at a specific retail chain called Car Plaza.



First generation (L200; 1978) 

The first generation model of Mitsubishi's compact pickup truck was first sold in Japan as the Mitsubishi Forte in September 1978 and continued until late 1986, when the line was cancelled in the Japanese domestic market for five years. In Japan the Forte was originally sold with the  1.6-litre 4G32 engine (L021P). Offered in basic Deluxe trim, the larger-engined version was also available in leisure-oriented Custom trim. The Custom also has a smoother and less utilitarian bed, without provisions for fitting a canvas top and with fewer hardpoints for strapping down loads.

In export versions, the 2.0-litre petrol version had , while a larger 2.6-litre unit offered . Also popular in many markets, was a  2.3-litre diesel engine. The  1.6-litre Saturn engine rounded out the lineup in many countries. A naked cab and chassis version was also available in some markets.

Mechanical features included recirculating ball steering and front disc brakes, rear-wheel drive, and front suspension with coil springs. Four-wheel drive (4WD) was added in 1981, featuring torsion bar suspension up front. The rear suspension for both comprised leaf springs with bias-mounted shock absorbers. The 4WD system incorporated an extra lever located alongside the main four-speed shifter. This provided three positions; 2WD in high-range, 4WD in high-range, and 4WD in low-range. In low-range, the vehicle travels at half road speed for any given engine rpm. The transfer case is chain-driven to the front wheels, making it lighter, quieter, and easier to shift than the more common gear type. As such, the driver can shift between 2WD and 4WD in high-range without using the clutch, with the activation of low-range requiring the vehicle to be stopped. A warning lamp would light when the 4WD was engaged.

Chrysler variants 

The Dodge Ram 50 (called the Dodge D50 for 1979 and 1980) was a badge-engineered version sold by the Chrysler Corporation from 1979 on. The label lasted until 1994, through two generations. Plymouth also received a version of the vehicle known as the Plymouth Arrow Truck, sold from 1979 to 1982. This was Chrysler's belated answer to the Ford Courier from Mazda and the Chevrolet LUV by Isuzu (both of which had been introduced in 1972), while the Toyota Hilux and Datsun Truck were already available and imported directly from Japan. Mitsubishi itself imported it as the Mitsubishi Mighty Max when it began selling directly in the US from 1982, at which point the Plymouth ceased to be available. The Dodge version had quad rectangular headlights beginning with the 1983 facelift, while Mitsubishis and earlier Dodges had single units in North America. In the rest of the world, importers could choose between single or double rectangular units, as well as twin round headlights. The twin round units were the original fitment for the Japanese domestic market.

Four-wheel drive was added for 1982. This created the Power Ram 50 in the United States, as in Dodge's nomenclature the "Power Ram" name was used for four wheel drive models. A turbo diesel engine was available in US models between 1983 and 1985. The 1983 turbodiesel was fitted with a TC05 non-wastegated turbo and produced  and  torque. Initially, two pickup versions were sold, the Commercial with the 1.6-litre Saturn (4G32) engine and the higher specification Recreational with the 2.0-litre Astron (4G52) engine. Both Commercials and Recreationals received a floor-shifted 4-speed manual, with a taller axle ratio for the Recreational. Commercials were specified with heavy duty suspension rated for  payloads; the Recreational version carries a  load. The reason for the halved payload was due to the sedan-type suspension of softer springs and more supple shock absorbers. The Recreational model also featured radial ply tires, electronic ignition, bucket seats, pile carpet, radio, floor console, sports steering wheel and an adjustable steering column as standard. An optional sports stripe package was also available. Options included a weather-tight, fibreglass canopy with foam rubber mattress. This was manufactured by Challenge Industries and incorporated sliding side windows. Later in 1979, a cab chassis body variant of the Commercial was released. In March 1980, the D-50 was renamed Chrysler L200 Express to form linkage with the newly released L300 Express vans. In October 1980, the Chrysler labelling made way for Mitsubishi badges following the establishment of Mitsubishi Motors Australia from Chrysler Australia's old operations. In June 1981, Mitsubishi released 4WD versions of the pickup and cab chassis, both with the 2.0-litre motor. Free-wheeling hubs to reduce noise and fuel use in 2WD mode were optional. In late 1981, the 2.0-litre with five-speed manual was made optional for the 2WD one-tonne suspension models.

Second generation (K00/K10/K20/K30; 1986) 

The second generation model was introduced in 1986 for most markets. In Australia, this model launched in October 1986 as the low-cost Triton. In Japan the pickups were not sold for a few years, making their return as the Strada in Japan in March 1991. A facelift took place for the 1993 model year, with a new grille and new plastic bumpers comprising most of the changes. It continued to be produced until 1996. Sales in the Japanese domestic market continued into the middle of 1997. The truck usually has a  2.5 litre diesel or an  turbo diesel engine, with the turbo diesel being the only engine available in the Japanese home market. The second generation Mitsubishi truck was also produced in Thailand.

Starting out as a fairly utilitarian truck, more comfortable versions were gradually added in most markets. The V6 was not a well liked engine specification by consumers, as it did not tow as well or make as much torque as the diesel four-cylinder engine did, and used much more fuel than the four-cylinder. The 3.0L V6 6G72 equipped models also had a flaw in the design of the engine lifters- noisy lifters resulted in catastrophic engine failure over time. The locally developed L200 Sport range, more stylish and often featuring two-tone paint, was very popular in New Zealand where the L200 was offered with five different engines.

North America

In the US it was known as the Mitsubishi Mighty Max or the Dodge Ram 50. Four-wheel drive (non-LSD) was also available, as were a four-speed automatic transmission, two bed lengths, and both regular and Macrocab (extended cab) options. There was also a higher-rated One-Ton model available on regular cab models with the longer bed.

In later years the standard engine was switched to a 2.4-litre inline-four producing .

Dodge Ram 50 
The Ram 50 was redesigned for 1987, which was the same year Chrysler introduced the Ram 50's successor, the Dodge Dakota. Despite this, sales of the Ram 50 continued for another seven years until 1994, possibly because the Ram 50 was a compact and the Dakota was a mid-size. The difference in size and cost left a niche for the Ram 50, and its cancellation may have been due more to a desire to show independence from Mitsubishi than because of any product overlap. The Mighty Max was taken off the US market after the 1996 model year, and its successor was not marketed in North America due to poor sales.

Third generation (K50/K60/K70; 1996) 

In 1996, a new generation model was introduced with 2.5-litre turbodiesel engines developing . Other engine options include two sixteen-valve fuel injected gasoline engines and a naturally aspirated diesel. The car participated in the Dakar Rally in 2005. Production ended in 2006. These were only built in Laem Chabang, Thailand, and were also exported to Japan between 1997 and 1999. In late 2001 the third generation pickup underwent a facelift with new headlights and other changes.

An SUV model developed from the Mitsubishi Triton, called the Mitsubishi Challenger was released to Japan in 1996. In overseas markets it was also badged Montero Sport, Pajero Sport, Shogun Sport, or Nativa. Challenger shares many components and some body panels (i.e. front doors) with the Strada pickup truck and utilises the second generation Mitsubishi Pajero wheelbase. The Challenger was also produced in Thailand as the Mitsubishi Strada G-Wagon. The Thai model, unlike the same vehicle manufactured elsewhere used the same front styling as the Strada pickup truck that it was based upon. It was retired from production in 2005, but the Challenger nameplate was resurrected for the second generation of the Mitsubishi Pajero Sport, launched in 2008 and which is also based on the following generation of the Mitsubishi Triton.

Fourth generation (KA/KB; 2005) 

The fourth generation Triton was released in 2005. Designed by Akinori Nakanishi, it was built exclusively by Mitsubishi's subsidiary in Thailand and was exported to 140 global markets. It was mostly known as L200 except for Japan and its subsidiary countries' markets. The car had a 2.5-litre turbo-diesel engine developing . The base version, available in some markets such as the Dominican Republic, had a 2.5-litre normally aspirated diesel engine and the L200 off-road version called the Savana had 200 hp.

In Japan, the Triton was exclusively equipped with 3.5-litre petrol engine and 4-speed automatic transmission and was sold from 2006 to 2011 - the only pick-up truck in the market at that time (excluding kei trucks). Despite its success overseas, it was a critical failure in Japan as workmen and traders preferred vans and station wagons. As a result, in August 2011 the Triton was pulled out from Mitsubishi's Japanese lineup.

Fifth generation (KJ/KK/KL; 2015) 

In 2014, Mitsubishi unveiled the all new L200 which went on sale in early 2015 (Asia-Pacific) and late 2015 (Europe and the Caribbean). It is powered by a new 2.4-litre diesel engine. Since 2015, the current generation L200 shares the same underpinnings as the newly rebadged Fiat Fullback intended for the European and Middle East markets. Fiat Chrysler Automobiles currently has no plans to introduce the Fullback in the North American market due to the U.S. chicken tax as well as the introduction of the Jeep Gladiator, based on the fourth-generation Jeep Wrangler SUV. For the 2017 model year, Ram Trucks rebadged the Triton as the Ram 1200 for the Middle East market.

In addition, due to being plagued by the previous-generation Triton's critical failure in Japanese market (in contrast to its overseas success), in addition to having heavy excise duties for pickup trucks there, Mitsubishi Motors currently has no plans to bring the current Triton to their home market.

Safety

Latin NCAP
The L200 in its most basic Latin American configuration with no airbags and no ESC received 0 stars for adult occupants and 2 stars for toddlers from Latin NCAP in 2019.

Euro NCAP
The L200 in its standard European configuration received 4 stars from Euro NCAP in 2015.

Markets

Malaysia 
The fifth generation Triton was launched in Malaysia in May 2015 being fully imported from Thailand. It was available in five variants: Triton Quest (MT), Triton MT, Triton VGT MT, Triton VGT AT and Triton VGT Adventure (AT). Two limited editions were made available including the: Triton Phantom Edition in January 2016 and the Triton Knight Edition in May 2016. Both were limited to 200 units each. 

In April 2017, the Triton was updated. Changes included additional safety features for the VGT models, change in the steering wheel design and different colour choices. 

In September 2017, the Triton VGT AT GL was launched and was positioned in between the Triton MT and Triton VGT MT. 

In November 2017, the Triton VGT AT Premium was added to the lineup. 

In January 2018, the Triton Athlete was launched as the new range topper.

In January 2019, the facelifted fifth generation Triton was launched in Malaysia with five variants: VGT (MT and AT), VGT Premium (MT and AT), Adventure X (AT only). The 4x2 Quest model remained unchanged.

Philippines 
The fifth generation Triton, known locally as the Strada was launched on 20 March 2015 and was offered in 6 trim levels; GL 4x2, GL 4x4, GLX 4x2, GLX V, GLS V and GLS Sport V. All trims were initially offered with the 2.5-litre 4D56 engine. In August 2016, the 2.4-litre MIVEC VGT engine was added alongside the GT trim.

The facelifted Strada was launched in January 2019. It is offered in 4 variants; GLX Plus, GLS 2WD, GLS 4WD and GT 4WD.

Facelifted C&C and GL models of Strada was launched in February 2020.

Facelift 
The Triton was refreshed for the 2019 model year at the 2018 Thailand International Motor Expo in Bangkok, Thailand. This update consists of new front fascia, which is inspired from the Pajero/Montero Sport, Eclipse Cross and Xpander, new teardrop taillight design treatment as the Pajero/Montero Sport, and slight changes in the interior for some variants. This model also received a rear air circulator located at the interior roof.

Sales

References

External links 

 Mitsubishi Triton official website 
  (global)

Triton
Cars introduced in 1978
1970s cars
1980s cars
1990s cars
2000s cars
2010s cars
2020s cars
Pickup trucks
Rear-wheel-drive vehicles
All-wheel-drive vehicles
Off-road vehicles
Euro NCAP pick-ups
Latin NCAP pick-ups
Cars powered by longitudinal 4-cylinder engines
Cars of Brazil